Vladimir Danilenko (born 23 September 1999) is a Russian Paralympic swimmer.

He won bronze in the 2020 Paralympics S2 100m backstroke.

References

External links
 

Living people
1999 births
Swimmers at the 2020 Summer Paralympics
Medalists at the 2020 Summer Paralympics
Paralympic bronze medalists for the Russian Paralympic Committee athletes
Paralympic swimmers of Russia
Russian male backstroke swimmers
Russian male freestyle swimmers
S2-classified Paralympic swimmers
20th-century Russian people
21st-century Russian people